Chelinidea tabulata is a species of leaf-footed bugs in the family Coreidae. It is found in Central America, North America, and South America.

References

 Henry, Thomas J., and Richard C. Froeschner, eds. (1988). Catalog of the Heteroptera, or True Bugs, of Canada and the Continental United States, xix + 958.
 Nishida, Gordon M., ed. (2002). "Hawaiian Terrestrial Arthropod Checklist, 4th ed.". Bishop Museum Technical Reports no. 22, iv + 313.
 Packauskas, Richard (2010). "Catalog of the Coreidae, or Leaf-Footed Bugs, of the New World". Fort Hays Studies, Fourth Series, no. 5, 270.
 Thomas J. Henry, Richard C. Froeschner. (1988). Catalog of the Heteroptera, True Bugs of Canada and the Continental United States. Brill Academic Publishers.

Further reading

 Arnett, Ross H. (2000). American Insects: A Handbook of the Insects of America North of Mexico. CRC Press.

Insects described in 1835
Chelinideini